Wat Ta Yom is a subdistrict (tambon) in the Bang Krathum District of Phitsanulok Province, Thailand.

Etymology
The first element wat (Thai: วัด) means 'temple'; the second element ta (Thai: ตา) means 'eye'; the third element 'yom' (Thai: ยม) means 'weep', hence 'weeping eye temple'.

Geography
Wat Ta Yom is bordered to the north by Nong Phra in Wang Thong District, to the north-east by Phan Chali in Wang Thong District, to the south-east by Noen Kum, and to the south-west by Phai Lom and to the north-west by Nakhon Pa Mak. The district consists of flat lowlands with no hills or forest. The majority of the land has been cleared for agricultural use. The Wat Ta Yom River flows through Wat Ta Yom. The subdistrict lies in the Nan Basin, which is part of the Chao Phraya Watershed.

History
Wat Ta Yom became a municipality in 1999.

Economy
The economy of Wat Ta Yom is almost entirely based on agriculture, and the chief product is rice.

Administration
The subdistrict is divided into eight smaller divisions called (muban). There are two villages in Wat Ta Yom, one of which, Ban Wat Ta Yom, occupies multiple mubans. Wat Ta Yom is administered by a Tambon administrative organization (TAO). The muban in Wat Ta Yom are enumerated as follows:

Temples
Wat Ta Yom is home to the following five temples:
Wat Jayrin Rat (Thai:  วัดเจริญราษฎร์) in Ban Wat Ta Yom
Wat Ta Yom in South Ban Wat Ta Yom
Wat Pracha Ram (Thai:  วัดประชาราม, People's Temple) in Ban Khok Sanam
วัดราษฎร์นิยม in Ban Wat Ta Yom
Wat Khok Sanam (Ban Khok Sanam Village Temple) in Ban Khok Sanam

References

Tambon of Phitsanulok province
Populated places in Phitsanulok province